Bangkok University (BU;), commonly known as  Mo Krung Thep, has operated since 1962, is one of the oldest and largest private, non-profit universities in Thailand. Bangkok University began in the Kluay Nam Thai area of Bangkok. The university expanded its operation to a second and, now, main campus in Rangsit, Pathum Thani to accommodate its rapid growth.

History

Campus

Kluay Nam Thai campus (city campus) 
The city campus (called Kluay Nam Thai campus) is in Phra Khanong Sub-district, Khlong Toei District. It occupies approximately 15,000 m2.  There are only a few classes still held at this campus.  Most likely 2020 Academic year will be the last academic year for any students to study at this campus.  Then it will be no longer used as a campus of Bangkok University.

Rangsit campus (main campus) 
The Rangsit campus (วิทยาเขตรังสิต) is in Khlong Neung Sub-district Khlong Luang District of Pathum Thani Province. It is approximately fourteen kilometres north of Don Mueang International Airport. The campus is approximately 265,000 m2 in size. Regular students in their first and second years study here, except that regular communication arts students (not international) study on this campus for four years. Also on the campus are the Bangkok University Stadium, home stadium of Bangkok University FC, Thailand Premier League 2006 champions, the Surat Osathanugrah Library, and Pongtip Osathanugrah Communication Arts Complex. The BU Southeast Asian Ceramics Museum, an important archaeological research facility, is on the Rangsit campus. The campus meets the ISO 14001 standard, the first in Thailand to do so.

The following use to be at the City Campus but has now been moved to the Main Campus (in Rangsit):  International students attend this campus, as well as academics in special programs. It is the campus for most students in their third or fourth years. It is the location of the office of the university president, as well as the international college, the graduate school, and other faculties. There are laboratories, classrooms, seminar rooms, libraries, computer centre, and an indoor sports centre. An art gallery, the Bangkok University Gallery (BUG), opened on the campus in 2006.

Organization and administration 
 BU Alumni;
 Creative Entrepreneurship Development Institute;
 Bangkok University Research Center;
 The Institute for Knowledge and Innovation, Southeast Asia;
Center for Promotion of Human Resources;
Institute of Research Promotion and Innovation Development;
Institutional Research and Evaluation Office;
Language Institute;
Law Center for Citizens.

Academics 
Using Thai as the language of instruction, Bangkok University awards bachelor's degrees, master's degrees, and doctoral degrees. The university also has an international program, using English as the language of instruction. The international program awards bachelor's, master's, and doctoral degrees.

Student life and traditions

Notable people

Alumni

Faculty

Explanatory notes

References

Citations

General and cited references

External links 

Bangkok University

Educational institutions established in 1962
Universities and colleges in Bangkok
Private universities and colleges in Thailand
1962 establishments in Thailand
Universities in Thailand